Hamed Behdad (born November 17, 1973) is an Iranian actor and singer. He has received various accolades, including a Crystal Simorgh, a Hafez Award, an Iran Cinema Celebration Award and two Iran's Film Critics and Writers Association Awards. He has won the  Golden Goblet Award for Best Actor at the 2019 Shanghai International Film Festival for his role in Castle of Dreams (2019).

Early life

Hamed Behdad was born on 17 November 1973 in Mashhad, Iran. He has lived his childhood and youth in Mashhad, Tehran, and Nishabur in a row.

Behdad has returned to his hometown, Mashhad, again with his family when he was a high school freshman. He holds a bachelor's degree in Fine Arts Acting from Islamic Azad University of Tehran, Iran.

Career 

Behdad was first introduced to Iran's Cinema with the movie, End of Game. He was then, nominated for Crystal Simorgh in the Fajr Film Festival for the Best First Actor for this movie.

In continue, he has been performing many memorable strong supporting roles in Iran's Cinema.

Behdad played as an Iraqi army officer in the movie Third Day in 2006. In this role, he is falling in love with an Iranian girl who lived in Khoramshahr, where it was in the siege of Iraq at that time. He again, for the second time, was nominated for Crystal Simorgh award in 25th Fajr Film Festival. He played his role in this movie that impressive that it drew a lot of attention from everyone of the contemporaneous filmmakers and critics.

Behdad's success in movie No One Knows About Persian Cats directed by Bahman Ghobadi qualified him to have an access to the Cannes Film Festival.

He received Crystal Simorgh Prize for Best Supporting Actor for his incredible role-playing in movie Crime directed by Masoud Kimiai in 29th Fajr Film Festival.

Behdad has also received critical acclaim for roles in films such as Boutique, Third Day, No One Knows About Persian Cats, Felicity Land, Crime, Hard Makeup, It Happened at Midnight, Blockage and Castle of Dreams.

During his path of career, he had great opportunities to cooperate with many of so successful and famous Iranian directors as Abbas Kiyarostami, Naser Taghvai, Masoud Kimiai and Dariush Mehrjui however unfortunately some of these cooperation have not been released yet.

Filmography

Film

Web

Television

References

External links

 
 

Iranian male film actors
1973 births
Living people
Iranian male stage actors
20th-century Iranian male actors
21st-century Iranian male actors
People from Mashhad
Male actors from Tehran
Crystal Simorgh for Best Supporting Actor winners